Metaphidippus pernix is a species of spider in the Salticidae (jumping spider) family found in Guatemala.

Taxonomy
The species was first described in 1901, as Metaphidippus pernix, by F. O. Pickard-Cambridge. In 1911, Alexander Petrunkevitch decided to transfer the species to the genus Dendryphantes. However, Dendryphantes pernix already existed as the name for a different species (Dendryphantes pernix Peckham & Peckham, 1901, now Beata pernix). Accordingly, Petrunkevitch coined the replacement specific name pernotus. In 1971, Jerzy Prószyński returned the species to Metaphidippus under its original name Metaphidippus pernix. The species has also been wrongly called Metaphidippus pernotus (Petrunkevitch, 1911), as in earlier versions of the World Spider Catalog.

References

Salticidae
Spiders of Central America
Spiders described in 1911